Allegrettia is a genus of beetles in the family Carabidae, containing the following species:

 Allegrettia bodeii Vailati, 2017
 Allegrettia boldorii Jeannel, 1928
 Allegrettia comottii Monguzzi, 2011
 Allegrettia pavani  Bari & Rossi, 1965
 Allegrettia pavani castionii Monzini, 2013
 Allegrettia pavani orobiensis Monzini, 2015
 Allegrettia pavani rossii Monguzzi, 2011
 Allegrettia pedersolii  Vailati, 2017
 Allegrettia tacoensis Comotti, 1990
 Allegrettia zavattarii Ghidini, 1934

References

Trechinae